Call It Macaroni is an American children's television series that premiered on January 24, 1975. It was produced by Group W (Westinghouse Broadcasting Company, Inc.) with executive producers Gail Frank and Stephanie Meagher. Prior to its release, Donald McGannon, the chair of Group W, announced the show was a call to action for children to have a specific slot for their television. Intended to be a 12-part series of children's specials to be aired once a month, due to its popularity, another 12 specials were produced.

Its goal was to show 10-12-year-olds different things they could experience in the United States. It follows a different group of children each episode as they go to different places within the country, learning about a culture, city, environment, job, or hobby.

The first season was sold to 100, 103 or 104 stations in syndication. It was well received and won a Peabody Award in 1975.

Episodes
There are 24 half-hour episodes of Call it Macaroni. Air dates listed below may be later than the first airing. One episode, "Gym Dandys", is viewable on YouTube.

References 

American children's education television series
Peabody Award-winning television programs
1970s American children's television series
1975 American television series debuts
1977 American television series endings